Yvon is a masculine given name. Notable people with the name include:

 Joseph Charles Léonard Yvon Beaulne (1919-1999), Canadian diplomat
 Yvon Dumont (born 1951), Canadian politician
 Yvon Barrette (21st century), Canadian actor
 Yvon Bertin (born 1953), French cyclist
 Yvon Bilodeau (born 1951), Canadian ice hockey player
 Yvon Bonenfant (21st century), Canadian politician
 Yvon Brochu (born 1944), Canadian politician
 Yvon Charbonneau (born 1940), Canadian politician
 Yvon Chouinard (born 1938), American mountain climber
 Yvon Collin (born 1944), French politician
 Yvon Cormier (1938-2009), Canadian professional wrestler
 Yvon Corriveau (born 1967), Canadian ice hockey player
 Yvon Côté (born 1939), Canadian politician
 Yvon Delbos (1885-1956), French politician
 Yvon Deschamps (born 1935), Canadian author
 Yvon Douis (born 1935), French footballer
 Yvon Ducharme, a fictional character
 Yvon Duhamel (born 1939), Canadian motorcycle racer
 Yvon Dupuis (born 1926), Canadian politician
 Yvon Durelle (1929-2007), Canadian boxer
 Yvon Gariepy (born 1926), President of the Royal Canadian Mint
 Yvon Gattaz (born 1925), French businessman
 Yvon Godin (born 1955), Canadian politician
 Yvon Goujon (born 1937), French footballer
 Yvon Krevé (21st century), Canadian hip hop singer
 Yvon L'Heureux (1914-1984), Canadian politician
 Yvon Labre (born 1949), Canadian ice hockey player
 Yvon Lafrance (born 1944), Canadian politician
 Yvon Lamarre (21st century), Canadian politician
 Yvon Lambert (born 1950), Canadian ice hockey player
 Yvon Lambert (photographer) (born 1955), Luxembourgian photojournalist
 Yvon Le Roux (born 1960), French footballer
 Yvon Lemire (21st century), Canadian politician
 Yvon Lévesque (born 1940), Canadian politician
 Yvon Marcoux (born 1941), Canadian politician
 Yvon Michel (21st century), Canadian boxing promoter
 Yvon Neptune (born 1946), Prime Minister of Haiti
 Yvon Pedneault (21st century), Canadian sports journalist
 Yvon Petra (1916-1984), French tennis player
 Yvon Picotte (born 1941), Canadian politician
 Yvon Pinard (born 1940), Canadian politician
 Yvon Poitras (born 1948), Canadian politician
 Yvon Pouliquen (born 1962), French football manager
 Yvon Repérant, French harpsichordist
 Yvon Robert (1914-1971), Canadian professional wrestler
 Yvon Tassé (1910-1998), Canadian politician
 Yvon Trèvédic (born 1902), French boxer
 Yvon Vallières (born 1949), Canadian politician
 Yvon Vautour (born 1956), Canadian ice hockey player
 Yvon Villarceau (1813-1883), French astronomer

French masculine given names
Given names derived from plants or flowers
Masculine given names